The Inmos microprocessor factory, also known as the Inmos factory or Newport Wafer Fab is a semiconductor fabrication plant for Inmos built in Newport, Wales, UK in 1980. It has gone through numerous changes in ownership. Since July 2021, the factory has been owned by Nexperia. In November 2022, Chinese state-owned Dutch-headquartered Nexperia was asked to divest 86% of its ownership.

The architects of the award-winning high-tech building were the Richard Rogers Partnership and the factory was the first building in Wales which Richard Rogers designed.

Ownership
The building was originally commissioned by Inmos, but by July 1984 Thorn EMI had taken over Inmos. 
In March 1989, Thorn EMI sold Inmos to SGS-Thomson Microelectronics NV. 

In 1999, a management buyout took over the factory, renaming the business, European Semiconductor Manufacturing Limited. 

In March 2002, the factory was sold to International Rectifier Company (GB) Limited.

In January 2015 it was acquired by Infineon Technologies, under its subsidiary company IR Newport Ltd. 

In September 2017, Infineon sold the site to Neptune 6 Limited, under its subsidiary company of Newport Wafer Fab Limited. 

In July 2021 the site was sold to Chinese-owned Dutch-headquartered Nexperia, who also have plants in Hamburg and Manchester. 

On 17 November 2022, the Department for Business, Energy and Industrial Strategy of the British government ordered Nexperia to divest 86% of its ownership interest in Nexperia Newport Limited (NNL, formerly Newport Wafer Fab) for national security reasons, which Nexperia has vowed to appeal. Nexperia's UK manager said they rescued an investment-starved company from collapse, [...] repaid taxpayer loans, secured jobs, wages, bonuses and pensions, and agreed to spend more than £80 million on equipment upgrades since early 2021". In December 2022, it was announced Nexperia had engaged New York law firm, Akin Gump to act on their behalf in their application for a judicial review of the UK government’s decision.

History of design and construction

Inmos Limited commissioned the Richard Rogers Partnership, now known as Rogers Stirk Harbour & Partners, to design its UK microprocessor manufacturing facility at Newport. The design criterion was for a fast construction, so that it was ready for operation within one year of starting. Richard Rogers until then was known for designing the Centre Pompidou in Paris and the Lloyd's building in London. The main contractor for the construction of the building was Laing Construction, the structural engineers were Anthony Hunt Associates, the services engineers were YRM Engineers and the quantity surveyors were GA Hanscomb Partnership.

The technical requirements were that it would house controlled conditions for the production of electronic microchips, a service area for various offices and a staff canteen, all under one roof. The Inmos factory was designed to be a model factory that could be constructed in a variety of locations. The speed of the design process and construction time of the building were critical. The  single-storey building was designed to be fabricated off-site, and assembled on the Newport site.

The building is divided into clean and "dirty" areas. The cleanroom being for microchip production and the dirty area for all others services in the building. Suspended beams span 40m from the central spine with masts along the length of the building allowing for a post-free area, and so providing a flexible interior and the possibility of large work areas. Reyner Banham, the architectural critic and writer, said of the Inmos factory that it was "the first really challenging building of the 1980s."
Construction began in 1980 and was completed by 1982.

Notes

External links

Inmos microprocessor factory on the Rogers Stirk Harbour & Partners website
Inmos microprocessor factory on the Great Buildings website
Photos of the construction of the Inmos microprocessor factory on www.inmos.com
AD Classics: Inmos Microprocessor Factory / Richard Rogers Partnership, link at ArchDaily

Buildings and structures in Newport, Wales
Commercial buildings completed in 1982
Richard Rogers buildings
1982 establishments in Wales